Blair Yakimoski is a Canadian provincial politician, who was elected as the Member of the Legislative Assembly of Manitoba for the riding of Transcona in the 2016 election. He is a member of the Manitoba Progressive Conservative Party. Yakimoski is of Ukrainian descent.

He was defeated by Nello Altomare in the 2019 Manitoba general election.

Electoral results

References 

Living people
Progressive Conservative Party of Manitoba MLAs
Politicians from Winnipeg
21st-century Canadian politicians
Canadian people of Ukrainian descent
Year of birth missing (living people)